Deadpool is a comic book anti-hero in the . Since 1993 he has starred in several ongoing series, as well as a number of limited series and one-shots.

Primary series 
 Deadpool Vol. 1: The Circle Chase #1–4 (August 1993November 1993)
 Deadpool Vol. 2: Sins of the Past  #1–4 [#5–8] (August 1994November 1994)
 Deadpool Vol. 3 #1–69 [#9–77] (May 1997September 2002). Includes a #0 issue in January 1998 and a #-1 issue in July 1997. Issues #57–60 were subtitled Agent of Weapon X while issues #61–64 were subtitled Funeral for a Freak.
 Daredevil/Deadpool '97 Annual (September 1997)
 1998 Annual Starring Deadpool and Death (July 1998)
 Agent X #1–15 [#78–92] (September 2002December 2003)
  Cable & Deadpool #1–50 [#93–142] (May 2004April 2008)
 Deadpool Vol. 4 #1–63 [#143–205] (September 2008August 2010). Includes a #900 issue in December 2009 and a #1000 issue in August 2010. Also includes #33.1 and #49.1.
 Deadpool Annual #1 (May 2011)
 Deadpool Vol. 5 #1–45 [#206–250] (November 2012June 2015)
 Deadpool Annual #1 (January 2014)
 Deadpool Annual #2 (July 2014)
 Deadpool Bi-Annual (November 2014)
 Deadpool Vol. 6 #1–36 [#251–286] (November 2015September 2017)
 Deadpool Vol. 6 #3.1 (February 2016)
 Despicable Deadpool #287–300 (October 2017July 2018)
 Deadpool Vol. 7 #1–15 [#301–315] (June 2018September 2019)
 Deadpool Annual #1 (August 2019)
 Deadpool Vol. 8 #1–10 [#316–325] (November 2019January 2021)
 Deadpool Vol. 9 #1– [#326–] (November 2022)

Spin-off series 
 Deadpool Team-Up #900–883 (December 2009May 2011). Title released in reverse since #899.
 Hit Monkey #1 (April 2010)
 Deadpool MAX #1–12 (December 2010September 2011)
 Deadpool MAX II #1–6 (October 2011March 2012)
 Gwenpool Holiday Special #1 (December 2015)
 Spider-Man/Deadpool #1–50 (March 2016May 2019)  
 Deadpool & The Mercs for Money Vol. 1  #1–5 (April 2016August 2016)
 Deadpool & The Mercs for Money Vol. 2  #1–10 (September 2016June 2017)

Limited series 
 Deadpool Suicide Kings #1–5 (June 2009October 2009)
 Deadpool: Merc With a Mouth #1–13 (September 2009September 2010)
 Prelude to Deadpool Corps #1–5 (May 2010)
 Deadpool Corps #1–12 (June 2010May 2011)
 Deadpool: Wade Wilson's War #1–4 (AugustNovember 2010)
 Deadpool Max #1–12 (November 2010November 2011)
 Deadpool Pulp #1–4 (November 2010February 2011)
 Fear Itself: Deadpool #1–3 (AugustOctober 2011)
 Deadpool Max II #1–6 (December 2011May 2012)
 Deadpool Kills the Marvel Universe #1–4 (October 2012)
 Deadpool Killustrated #1–4 (MarchJune 2013)
 Deadpool Kills Deadpool #1–4 (JulyOctober 2013)
 Night of the Living Deadpool #1–4 (JanuaryMarch 2014)
 Deadpool Vs. Carnage #1–4 (JuneAugust 2014)
 Deadpool: Dracula's Gauntlet #1–7 (JulyAugust 2014)
 Deadpool Vs. X-Force #1–4 (JulySeptember 2014)
 Hawkeye Vs. Deadpool #0–4 (September 2014January 2015)
 Deadpool's Art of War #1–4 (October 2014January 2015)
 Return of the Living Deadpool #1–4 (FebruaryMay 2015)
 Deadpool's Secret Secret Wars #1–4  (May 2015August 2015)
 Mrs. Deadpool and the Howling Commandos #1–4 (September 2015November 2015)
 Deadpool vs. Thanos #1–4  (September 2015October 2015)
 Deadpool & Cable: Split Second #1–3  (December 2015February 2016)
 Deadpool and the Mercs For Money #1–5 (February 2016June 2016)
 Deadpool and the Mercs For Money (Volume 2) #1–10 (July 2016April 2017)
 Deadpool v Gambit #1–5 (August 2016November 2016)
 Deadpool Back in Black #1–5 (December 2016February 2017)
 Deadpool Too Soon? #1–4 (December 2016March 2017)
 Deadpool The Duck #1–5 (March 2017May 2017)
 Deadpool vs. The Punisher #1–5 (June 2017August 2017)
 Deadpool Kills The Marvel Universe Again #1–5 (July 2017September 2017)
 Deadpool vs. Old Man Logan #1–5 (October 2017February 2018)
 You are Deadpool #1–5 (May 2018)
 Deadpool: Assassin #1–6 (June 2018August 2018)
 Deadpool: Secret Agent Deadpool #1–6 (September 2018November 2018)
 Black Panther vs. Deadpool #1–5 (October 2018February 2019)
 Absolute Carnage vs. Deadpool #1–3 (August 2019October 2019)
 Deadpool: Black, White & Blood #1-4 (August 2021November 2021)
 Deadpool Samurai#1-#2 (Feb 2022) 
 Deadpool Bad Blood #1-#4 (April 2022-June 2022)

Digital series 

 Deadpool: The Gauntlet Infinite Comic #1–13 (JanuaryApril 2014)
 Deadpool & Cable: Split Second Infinite Comic #1–6
 Deadpool: Too Soon? Infinite Comic #1–8

One-shots 

 Encyclopædia Deadpoolica (December 1998)
 Baby's First Deadpool Book #1 (December 1998)
 Deadpool Team-Up Starring Deadpool and Widdle Wade #1 (December 1998)
 Deadpool/GLI: Summer Fun Spectacular (September 2007)
 Deadpool: Game$ of Death #1 (May 2009)
 Deadpool Corps: Rank and Foul (March 2010)
 Lady Deadpool #1 (July 2010)
 X-Men Origins: Deadpool #1 (July 2010)
 What If Venom Possessed Deadpool? #1 (February 2011)
 Deadpool/Cable #26 (February 2011).
 Deadpool Family #1 (April 2011)
 Wolverine/Deadpool: The Decoy #1 (July 2011)
  Deadpool Max-mas #1 (December 2011)
 Deadpool Bi-Annual #1 (September 2014)
 Death of Wolverine: Deadpool & Captain America #1 (October 2014)
 Deadpool: Last Days of Magic #1 (May 2016)
 Season's Beatings #1 (December 2018)
 Deadpool: The end #1 (January 2021)
 Deadpool Nerdy 30 #1 ( March 2021)
 X-Force: Killshot #1 (Jan 2022)

Graphic novels

 Deadpool: Bad Blood (112 pages, Marvel Comics, hardcover, May 2017)

Collected editions

Epic Collections

Modern Era Epic Collections

Limited series

First series (1997) and Deadpool Classic

Cable & Deadpool (2004)

Second series (2008)

Third series (2012)

Fourth series (2016)

Despicable Deadpool (2017)

Fifth series (2018)

King Deadpool (2019)

Seventh Series (2022)

Deadpool Team-Up (2009)

Deadpool Corps (2010)

Deadpool MAX (2010)

Spider-Man/Deadpool (2016)

Deadpool & the Mercs for Money (2016)

Other series

Oversized hardcovers

References

External links 

 
 
 All Deadpool Appearances in Chronological Order

 
Lists of comic book titles
Lists of comics by character
Lists of comics by Marvel Comics